Alan Leandro da Silva Pinheiro (born January 14, 1989) is a football player. He is the current forward for Karketu Dili. Born in Brazil, he played for the Timor-Leste national team.

International career
An Afro-Brazilian, Alan was born in Carapicuíba, state of São Paulo and naturalized East Timorese by fellow Brazilian Antônio Carlos Vieira, who was then the coach of Timor-Leste. Starting debut in 2011 SEA Games, first match was against Brunei U23, he had an opportunity to score in the 44th minute but his shot ran above the bar.

International goals
Scores and results list Timor-Leste's goal tally first.

References

External links
 https://web.archive.org/web/20121009062239/http://www.affsuzukicup.com/players/ALAN

1989 births
Living people
People from Carapicuíba
East Timorese footballers
Timor-Leste international footballers
Brazilian footballers
Association football forwards
Brazilian expatriate footballers
Expatriate footballers in Thailand
Alan Leandro
Footballers from São Paulo (state)